Patumahoe or Patumāhoe is a small town of Auckland, New Zealand. It is in the Franklin Ward of Auckland Council.

The name means to strike or kill with a patu made of wood from māhoe.

Demographics
It is part of the larger Patumahoe statistical area.

Patumāhoe urban area had a population of 1,176 at the 2018 New Zealand census, an increase of 513 people (77.4%) since the 2013 census, and an increase of 621 people (111.9%) since the 2006 census. There were 396 households, comprising 585 males and 588 females, giving a sex ratio of 0.99 males per female, with 306 people (26.0%) aged under 15 years, 162 (13.8%) aged 15 to 29, 576 (49.0%) aged 30 to 64, and 126 (10.7%) aged 65 or older.

Ethnicities were 92.1% European/Pākehā, 8.2% Māori, 4.1% Pacific peoples, 3.6% Asian, and 2.6% other ethnicities. People may identify with more than one ethnicity.

Although some people chose not to answer the census's question about religious affiliation, 57.7% had no religion, 33.4% were Christian, 0.5% had Māori religious beliefs, 0.8% were Hindu, 0.3% were Muslim, 0.5% were Buddhist and 1.5% had other religions.

Of those at least 15 years old, 159 (18.3%) people had a bachelor's or higher degree, and 129 (14.8%) people had no formal qualifications. 288 people (33.1%) earned over $70,000 compared to 17.2% nationally. The employment status of those at least 15 was that 543 (62.4%) people were employed full-time, 111 (12.8%) were part-time, and 30 (3.4%) were unemployed.

Patumahoe statistical area

The statistical area had a population of 2,334 at the 2018 New Zealand census, an increase of 615 people (35.8%) since the 2013 census, and an increase of 756 people (47.9%) since the 2006 census. There were 765 households, comprising 1,170 males and 1,164 females, giving a sex ratio of 1.01 males per female. The median age was 39.3 years (compared with 37.4 years nationally), with 519 people (22.2%) aged under 15 years, 381 (16.3%) aged 15 to 29, 1,146 (49.1%) aged 30 to 64, and 288 (12.3%) aged 65 or older.

Ethnicities were 91.0% European/Pākehā, 10.5% Māori, 3.2% Pacific peoples, 4.9% Asian, and 2.7% other ethnicities. People may identify with more than one ethnicity.

The percentage of people born overseas was 18.6, compared with 27.1% nationally.

Although some people chose not to answer the census's question about religious affiliation, 56.3% had no religion, 33.7% were Christian, 0.3% had Māori religious beliefs, 0.9% were Hindu, 0.6% were Muslim, 0.5% were Buddhist and 1.5% had other religions.

Of those at least 15 years old, 351 (19.3%) people had a bachelor's or higher degree, and 279 (15.4%) people had no formal qualifications. The median income was $46,300, compared with $31,800 nationally. 543 people (29.9%) earned over $70,000 compared to 17.2% nationally. The employment status of those at least 15 was that 1,083 (59.7%) people were employed full-time, 273 (15.0%) were part-time, and 42 (2.3%) were unemployed.

Education

Notable locations
St Bride's Church, 32 Findlay Road Mauku, an Anglican church built in 1861.
Wright's Watergardens, 128 Mauku Road, Patumahoe, a private garden based around Mauku Waterfall and an old quarry, open to the public.
Patumahoe war memorial domain, 19 Patumahoe Road, sports grounds and a World War 2 memorial.

References

Populated places in the Auckland Region